Before and during World War II, the various Breton nationalist movements were generally right-wing, and sometimes fascist. The extent to which this led to collaboration with the Nazi occupiers of France during the war, together with their motivations, is a matter of historical controversy.

Background 

Before the occupation,  Breton nationalists were split between regionalism, federalism, and separatism.  Essentially these factions, though divided, remained insensitive and frankly hostile to democratic ideals.  Among these groups, only the openly separatist Breton National Party remained organized; dissolved in 1939, it was rapidly reconstituted in the autumn of 1940 and became the most active political party in Brittany under the Occupation.  Having broken in 1931 from regionalism, its founders (Olier Mordrel and François Debeauvais) were inspired by the Irish War of Independence and played the nationalist card.  When war broke out, the Breton National Party chose a position of strict neutrality. This party's ideas were anti-democratic and complacent towards xenophobia and antisemitism, influenced by German racism and close to all the varieties of European fascism. During the war the activism of the Breton National Party completely dominated the other branches of the Breton movement, who found themselves discredited.

Collaboration with the Vichy regime 

On 15 December 1940 a "petition" signed by 46 Bretons requesting "administrative autonomy" in the confines of a united France was sent to Philippe Pétain.  On 22 January 1941, the Vichy government named Hervé Budes de Guébriant President of the National Commission for Agricultural Cooperation.  The daily journal La Bretagne was created by Yann Fouéré on 21 March 1941.  It took a regionalist point of view, opposed to the separatism of the Breton National Party.  An appreciable number of Breton nationalists were also to be found in the Consultative Committee of Brittany, created on 11 October 1942 by Jean Quénette, prefect of the region of Brittany.  "An organization of study and work", according to Yvonnig Gicquel, it did not wield any executive or decisive powers (against the wishes of the provincial parliament which conceived the adoption of the Breton regionalist doctrine).  The will of its members (including members of the Breton National Party Yann Fouéré, Joseph Martray, etc.) was to transform this consultative committee into a true legislative assembly to tackle regional problems.  Many of its members were to resurface when CELIB was created.

Collaboration with Germany

German politics
The work of Henri Fréville and Kristian Hamon have opened up this field for research. Three different periods can be considered.

Before 1939, Germany was trying to stop France and the United Kingdom from entering the war. During the phony war, Germany planned to favor regionalist movements (particularly those of Flanders and Brittany) in order to undermine France. This was in revenge for the Treaty of Versailles, and to ensure that Germany remained the only Continental power, with no threats on its western border. Some weapons were delivered but never used. By the end of June and early July, some Breton nationalists could take it for granted the independence of Brittany was well on the way when the Germans appointed a military governor in Brittany ruling over the five départements of ancient Brittany.

However, after the defeat of France a settlement was quickly made with the occupying power. The projects to undermine France were abandoned and the support for the nationalists disappeared (in particular it was formally forbidden to proclaim a Breton state or to harm public order).  Moreover, the formal annexation of Alsace-Lorraine was never proclaimed.  After the Conference of Montoire nationalist movements were simply tolerated (transport permits were given as well as authorizations for purchases of gasoline that soon meant little in practice), and German support went no further than preventing the Vichy regime from suppressing the nationalist movements.

Ideology
Bretons were not considered untermenschen (subhuman) by the Nazis, unlike the Jews and Gypsies for example. Mordrel, Lainé and some other Celticists argued that the Bretons were a 'pure' strain of the Celtic race, who had retained their "Nordic" qualities, a view consistent with Nazi Aryan master race ideology. Other Nationalists, such as Perrot, adopted a more conservative-Catholic stance consistent with longstanding Breton anti-radical ideologies that had emerged among the Royalist-Catholic "Whites" during the French Revolution.

Strategic rationale
A main intention of the German occupiers was to break French national unity. Its support for Breton nationalism needs to be seen in this wider context which included other aspects, for example the division of France into the occupied zone and the Vichy zone. However Breton nationalists very soon realized that Germany was in practice trying to keep its friends in the Vichy government content and therefore refusing to give any priority at all to the Breton nationalist demands.

Nazi scholar Rudolf Schlichting toured the region and sent the following comment to his superiors: "from a racial point of view there would be no objection to a Germanization of the Breton population. It is evident that we have no interest in promoting the Breton national consciousness, once the separation [with France] is accomplished. Not a penny should be spent on the promotion of the Breton language. The French language will however be replaced by German. In one generation Brittany will be a predominately (sic) German country. This goal is definitely attainable through the schools, the authorities, the army and the press."

Breton National Party
Important members of the Breton National Party including Morvan Lebesque and Alan Heusaff began collaborating with the Germans to one degree or another. The example of Ireland, or even the ideal of an independent Brittany - continued to be their reference points. Recent studies have shown the close links that Breton separatist leaders such Célestin Lainé and Alan Louarn had with German military intelligence (the Abwehr), going back well before the war, to the 1920s. After the defeat of 1940, the Germans used these separatist agents in military operations or in repression against the Resistance. A short-lived breakaway faction of the Breton National Party, created in 1941, was the Mouvement Ouvrier Social-National Breton (Breton National-Socialist Workers Movement) led by Théophile Jeusset.

Brezona 
At the end of 1940, Job Loyant — along with Kalondan, André Lajat, and Yves Favreul-Ronarc'h, a former leader of the Breton National Party in Loire-Atlantique — developed the doctrine of the Brezona movement: supremacy of the Breton race, formation of a national community, and government by the elite.  This movement was to have but a brief existence.  To prevent a possible takeover of the BNP by this splinter group, Yann Goulet appeared at Nantes to pronounce the excommunication of the Brezona "deviationists."  With his revolver in plain sight on the hip of the black uniform he wore as chief of the Youth Organizations, he left no doubt as to his intentions.  The Nantes PNB meeting, at which the Brezona movement had hoped to take control, took place without incident.

Bezen Perrot

A number of Breton nationalists choose to join the Bezen Perrot organization, a German militia led by Célestin Lainé and Alan Heusaff.  As many as 70 to 80 people joined its ranks at one point or another, with typically 30 to 66 at any one time depending on recruiting and defection.  At the end of the war a handful of Breton militants decided to ask for German support in the face of the assassination of several leading figures of the Breton cultural movement, such as Abbé Perrot.  Having originally been named Bezen Kadoudal, the 1943 assassination of the priest prompted Lainé to give his name to the organization in December of that year.

It had already been envisaged by German strategists that in the event of Allied invasion the Breton nationalists would form a rearguard, and that further nationalist troops could be parachuted into Brittany. In late 1943 sabotage dumps had been hidden for use by the militia.

Strolladoù Stourm
The Strolladoù Stourm (also known as Bagadoù stourm), led by Yann Goulet and Alan Louarn, was the armed wing of the Breton National Party.  A handful of their members took part in a confrontation with the population of Landivisiau, on August 7, 1943. Yann Goulet, their leader, forbade participation in Bezen Perrot.

Landerneau Kommando
By April 1943, the Gestapo had created specific units to combat the French Resistance. Formed at the end of April 1944 in Landerneau, the Landerneau Kommando took part in these units.  It was composed of 18 German soldiers and ten French agents (some of whom were Breton separatists as well as former Resistance members). They fought against the maquis (rural French Resistance units) of Trégarantec, Rosnoën, and Ploumordien. Several Resistance members were tortured, and the Kommando also summarily executed some prisoners.

Actions by the Resistance

Several Breton nationalists were assassinated by the Resistance in 1943. The best known was Abbé Perrot, killed on 12 December 1943 by Jean Thépaut, a member of the Communist Resistance. Earlier, on the 3 September, Yann Bricler had been shot in his office by three FTP members, and similarly Yves Kerhoas was killed by the Resistance when leaving a fete in the village of Plouvenez. When American troops arrived in 1944, communist maquis members began their repressive actions. Jeanne Coroller-Danio, the Breton historian who worked under the name Danio, was beaten to death along with her brother-in-law, Commander Le Minthier; the Tastevint brothers were castrated, and the Maubré sisters and their brother were savagely murdered in Morbihan.

The BNP, dissolved along with the French Communist Party in 1939, no longer legally existed.  Its activists were hunted down and not distinguished from the Breton militants who wore the symbol of the dukes of Brittany ("ermine-trimmed berets").  Many were deported to detention camps; notably at the Camp Marguerite in Rennes where 150 nationalists were detained for alleged collaborationism.  The Breton nationalists sought to defend the fact that their widespread image as an overtly fascist, even Nazi, movement had nothing to do with the actual political backgrounds of their activists, as varied as the Action française (royalist), the French Section of the Workers' International (SFIO, socialist), the separatist Breton National Party (PAB), or the French Communist Party.  Moreover, Yann Goulet received financial and public backing from several communist militants at the time of the Liberation.  Other militants accused of collaboration demonstrated to the courts that they had protected Jewish families during the occupation (Alan Eon–Yann Goulet).

The nationalist movement after the liberation of France 
After France was liberated, it was as collaborators, not as separatists, that the PNB members were punished, and even then it was by no means all those members that were affected. Only 15 to 16 per cent of PNB members appeared in court, and few non-member sympathisers were prosecuted. Most leading members escaped in Ireland or Germany and were not judged. There was no mass repression as claimed in post-war separatist propaganda. However the post-war nationalist movements will tend to minimise the collaboration with Nazi Germany and will create the myth of the separatists' repression by the French government.

Still today, some people are worried by the "collective amnesia" of the current Breton autonomist movement about World War II or by their attempts to rehabilitate the nationalist collaborationists.

On the other hand, the standpoint of the Breton nationalists consider that the representation of the Breton nationalism during World War II in the media is a pretext to discredit the current aspirations of the autonomist movement, such as the recognition of linguistic rights.

Involvement in the Resistance 
Several leading Breton activists – regionalists, federalists and separatists – joined the Resistance against the occupation. They had various motivations:

Sao Breiz
As early as 1940 some joined Sao Breiz, the Breton wing of the Free French. This included several members of the Union Régionaliste Bretonne (Breton Regionalist Union) and the Ar brezoneg er skol association, founded before the war by Yann Fouéré. M. de Cadenet, a member of the latter group, and some of his associates wrote a draft statute, presented to General Charles de Gaulle which would have given Brittany a number of political freedoms after the return of peace. According to Yann Fouéré, this plan was close in spirit to the one that the Breton Consultative Committee wanted to submit in 1943 to Marshal Pétain. Neither of these two plans resulted in anything.

Joining underground organisations
Activists like Francis Gourvil, Youenn Souffes-Després and Jean Le Maho had before the war been members of minority separatist or federalist movements such as the Parti Autonomiste Breton (PAB) or the Ligue fédéraliste de Bretagne. These organisations were always clearly anti-fascist and critical of the extreme right. This led their members directly into the underground Resistance. Others joined the Resistance as individuals and after the war restarted their involvement in Breton nationalism. The action of a few members of Bezen Perrot has often concealed a very different reality, for example the members of Bagadou Stourm who founded the Forces Bretonnes de l'Intérieur (Breton Forces of the Interior, a Breton wing of de Gaulle's French Forces of the Interior), and were deported to Buchenwald.

Liberty Group
For other groups, such as the Liberty Group of Saint-Nazaire (composed of young former members of Bagadoù stourm), pro-British feeling was the determining factor in pushing them to ally themselves with the Resistance.  The Liberty Group, under the name of Bataillon de la Poche ("Pocket Battalion"), helped to liberate Saint-Nazaire from a pocket of German holdouts in May 1945.

Breton nationalists linked to the London-based leadership of the Resistance 
 The painter René-Yves Creston, despite his involvement with L'Heure Bretonne (a Breton nationalist and antisemitic newspaper), was affiliated with the Resistance network of the Musée de l'Homme. He was engaged in reconnaissance work for the British. It seems that in October 1940, he received via Yann Fouéré a memo destined for London concerning Breton autonomy (to be continued by the Comité Consultatif de Bretagne), with a short preface specifying the origins of the "Breton question."
 In 1940, the overtly pro-Nazi Olier Mordrel covertly sent Hervé Le Helloco on a mission to England (via the channels of the Resistance) in order to convince the leadership of the Resistance of the "Allied leanings" of the Breton movement.  This effort went no further because of Helloco's track record, and the reaction of the Nazi-allied PNB.

Bibliography 
In chronological order, earliest first

English language
Reece, Jack E. (1977) The Bretons against France: ethnic minority nationalism in twentieth-century Brittany. Chapel Hill: University of North Carolina Press
 Biddiscombe, Perry (2001) "The Last White Terror: the Maquis Blanc and its impact in liberated France, 1944-1945", in: The Journal of Modern History, 2001
Leach, Daniel (2008) "Bezen Perrot: the Breton nationalist unit of the SS, 1943-5"
Leach, Daniel (2009) Fugitive Ireland: European minority nationalists and Irish political asylum, 1937-2008. Dublin: Four Courts Press

French language
 Le mouvement breton. Automatisme et fédéralisme. Carhaix, Éd. 'Armoricai, sans date (1937). by René Barbin
 La Bretagne écartelée. Essai pour servir à l'histoire de dix ans. 1938-1948 -. Nouvelles éditions latines. 1962. by Yann Fouéré.
 Complots pour une République bretonne -. La Table Ronde. 1967. by Ronan Caerleon
 La Bretagne contre Paris -. La Table Ronde. 1969 de Jean Bothorel
 La Bretagne dans la guerre. 2 volumes. France-Empire. 1969. by Hervé Le Boterf
 Racisme et Culte de la race.- La Bretagne réelle. Celtia. (Rennes). Été 1970.  Supplément à La Bretagne réelle N°300. par P.-M. de Beauvy de Kergalec.
 Breiz Atao -. Alain Moreau. 1973. Olier Mordrel.
 Le rêve fou des soldats de Breiz Atao. Nature et Bretagne. 1975.  by Ronan Caerleon
 Histoire résumée du mouvement breton-. Nature et Bretagne. 1977. by Yann Fouéré.
 Nous ne savions que le breton et il fallait parler français -. Mémoire d'un paysan du Léon. Breizh hor bro. 1978. by Fanch Elegoët.
 La Bretagne, Problèmes du régionalisme en France, Cornelsen-Velhagen & Klasing, Berlin 1979.
 La Bretagne sous le gouvernement de Vichy -. Edition France-Empire. 1982. by Hervé Le Boterf.
 Histoire du mouvement breton, Syros, 1982. by Michel Nicolas.
 Archives secrètes de Bretagne, 1940-1944, Rennes, Ouest-France, 1985. d'Henri Fréville
 Breizh/Europa. Histoire d'une aspiration -. Edition Ijin. 1994. Annaig Le Gars.
 Les nationalistes bretons sous l'Occupation, Le Relecq-Kerhuon, An Here, 2001. by Christian Hamon.
 L'hermine et la croix gammée. Le mouvement breton et la collaboration, Ed. Mango, 2001. by Georges Cadiou.
 Les usages politiques de la Seconde Guerre mondiale en Bretagne : histoire, mémoire et identité régionale. Marc Bergère.
 Archives secrètes de Bretagne 1940-1944 par Henri Fréville, éditions Ouest France, 2004
 De 1940 à 1941, réapparition d'une Bretagne provisoirement incomplète, un provisoire destiné à durer, bulletin et mémoires de la Société archéologique et historique d'Ille-et-Vilaine, tome CXIV. 2010. by Etienne Maignen.

References

Breton nationalism
Home front during World War II
Breton collaborators with Nazi Germany
France in World War II